The Center District, or simply the Center, is a district of the City Municipality of Ljubljana in the centre of Ljubljana, the capital of Slovenia.

The district's major thoroughfares are Slovene Street, Čop Street, Cankar Street, Wolf Street, Trubar Street, and Miklosich Street, and the major squares are Congress Square, Croatian Square, Liberation Front Square, Prešeren Square, Republic Square, and Slovene Square.

External links

Center District on Geopedia

 
Districts of Ljubljana